Maikel Hermann Naujoks García (born 18 March 1976), known simply as Maikel, is a Spanish former professional footballer who played as a striker. He also held German citizenship.

Career
Born in Iserlohn, West Germany to a German father and a Spanish mother from Galicia, Maikel spent most of his career in the second (CD Toledo, Getafe CF, SD Compostela, Terrassa FC, CD Tenerife and Lorca Deportiva CF, suffering four relegations) and third divisions of Spanish football, but appeared 17 times for Deportivo de La Coruña in La Liga over three seasons.

He played his first game in the top flight on 26 May 1996, coming on as a 62nd-minute substitute in a 2–2 home draw against FC Barcelona, and his best input at the professional level consisted of 19 goals in 36 matches for Compostela in the 2002–03 campaign, with his team finishing in ninth position in the second tier but being relegated due to financial irregularities.

References

External links

1976 births
Living people
People from Iserlohn
German people of Spanish descent
German emigrants to Spain
Sportspeople from Arnsberg (region)
Spanish footballers
Association football forwards
La Liga players
Segunda División players
Segunda División B players
Tercera División players
Deportivo Fabril players
Deportivo de La Coruña players
CD Toledo players
Xerez CD footballers
Getafe CF footballers
SD Compostela footballers
Terrassa FC footballers
CD Tenerife players
Lorca Deportiva CF footballers
Benidorm CF footballers
CD Lugo players
Pontevedra CF footballers